Lozotaenia djakonovi is a species of moth of the family Tortricidae. It is found in Turkey and Russia, where it has been recorded from alpine and subalpine belts in the northern Caucasus.

The wingspan is 24–28 mm. The ground colour of the forewings is reddish brown.

References

Moths described in 1963
Archipini